The following topics pertain to eschatology, a part of theology, physics, philosophy and futurology concerned with what are believed to be the final events of human history, the ultimate destiny of humanity — commonly referred to as the "end of the world" or "end time".

Interreligious
 Apocalypticism
 The Last Judgment
 Millenarianism
 Resurrection of the Dead
 Messianic Age
 The World to Come
 List of dates predicted for apocalyptic events

Abrahamic
 Gog and Magog
 Kingdom of God

Christianity
 Christian eschatology
 Futurism (Christianity)
 Historicism (Christianity)
 Idealism (Christian eschatology)
 Preterism
 Inaugurated eschatology
 Eternal life (Christianity)
 Second Coming of Christ
 The New Earth
 Apocalypse, concept in the New Testament, referring to the final revelation
 Armageddon, site of an epic battle associated with end time prophecies
 Millennialism
 Amillennialism
 Postmillennialism
 Premillennialism

Islam
 Islamic eschatology

Judaism
 Jewish eschatology
 Jewish messianism
 Third Temple

Buddhism
 Buddhist eschatology
 Maitreya

Hinduism
 Hindu eschatology
 Kalki
 Kali Yuga

Zoroastrianism
 Frashokereti
 Saoshyant

Other
 Li Hong (Taoist eschatology)
 Ragnarök
 Technological singularity
 Ultimate fate of the universe

References

 
Eschatology